Roni Fatahillah (born 7 November 1993) is an Indonesian professional footballer who plays as a central defender for Liga 2 club Nusantara United.

Club career 
Roni started his football career with PS Kwarta Deli Serdang club then moved to Gresik United and in 2016 he joined PSMS Medan.

In 2017, he played with PSMS Medan in Liga 2 and they managed to be runner-up 2017 Liga 2 as well as a club promotion to 2018 Liga 1.

Honours

Club 
PS Kwarta Deli Serdang
 Liga Indonesia First Division: 2013
PSMS Medan
 Liga 2 runner-up: 2017
 Piala Presiden 4th position: 2018

References

External links 
 
 Roni Fatahillah at Liga Indonesia

PSMS Medan players
Gresik United players
PS Kwarta Deli Serdang players
People from Garut
Indonesian footballers
1993 births
Living people
Association football defenders